Mount Tagapo, also known as Susong Dalaga mountain, is a conical peak on the lake island of Talim on Laguna de Bay, the largest lake in the Philippines. The peak falls under the jurisdiction of the towns of Binangonan and Cardona in Rizal province.

Etymology

The name is derived from the Tagalog word taga, meaning "to chop". The island's name, talim (also in Tagalog), means "blade" in English, probably named after its outline on maps, which looks like a short sword. The peak is also locally known as Bundok Susong Dalaga (Maiden's breast mountain), due to its conical shape.

Geography
The peak falls under the jurisdiction of the towns of Binangonan and Cardona, which divide the island almost into two halves, the west (Binangonan) and east (Cardona). The island forms the southwestern rim of the Laguna Caldera, a large caldera that occupies the middle section of Laguna de Bay. Mount Sembrano range, across the lake on the Jalajala Peninsula, forms the eastern and the highest peak of the caldera.

Mount Tagapo lies at the latitudinal center of Talim Island at the point, about a third of the island from its southern tip, where a shorter ridge [ long] intersects the island on its eastern side forming a T-junction. Southeast and west of Mount Tagapo peak are craters formed after the formation of the caldera.

Climbing the mountain
Mount Tagapo is a worthwhile destination among local climbers as it is not tall mountain to climb, and climbers are rewarded by the one-of-a-kind panoramic views because of its location at the center of the large Laguna de Bay. The hike to Mount Tagapo starts with a ferry boat ride from the Port of Binangonan. The boat trip could take a while as boats do not leave unless they are full and stop at every barangay ports of Talim Island till it encircles the island before returning to Binangonan Port.

The peak can be reached in 1.5 to 2 hours and can be ascended from either the Binangonan or Cardona side of the mountain, depending on the difficulty desired. The trail on western side of the mountain is an easy to moderate hike starting in Barangay Janosa in Binangonan. Climbers register and pay the fee at the barangay hall where guides are also available for hire. A steeper, more difficult hike to the top is available if coming from the eastern side of the mountain starting at Barangay Lambac in Cardona, where guides can be hired as well at the barangay hall. It is also possible to traverse the mountain from one town to the other, but guides are only available uphill as they have to return to their hometowns afterwards.

The climb to the top can be very hot during summer as there is no shade on the upper slope. The initial part starts with a trek through forests of trees and bamboos. Villagers make their livelihood by manufacturing bamboo products. Their leaves can be very sharp and could cut skin or poke someone's eyes especially on windy days.

Upon reaching the barren top, a 360-degree view of the entire Laguna Lake and its coastal towns can be beheld, including the skylines of Metro Manila to the northwest. Mountains visible include nearby Mount Sembrano to volcanic mountains like the three peaks of Mount Banahaw volcano complex (from left to right, Mounts Banahaw de Lucban, Banahaw and San Cristobal) in the southward direction with Mounts Atimbia and Kalisungan (aka Mount Nagcarlan) before the complex; to the southwest, Mount Makiling with the farther Mount Macolod and Mount Sungay to its right; to the far north, Mt. Arayat on a very clear day; and eastward are the nameless mountains of the Sierra Madre mountain range.

References

External links

Landforms of Rizal
Tagapo